Lal Loi is the Sindhi name for the festival of Lohri. Prior to the Partition of India in 1947, Lal Loi was celebrated in some parts of Sindh. On the day of Lal Loi children brought wood sticks from their grand parents and aunties and lit a fire burning the sticks in the night with people enjoying, dancing and playing around the fire.

Sindhis believe that the focus of Lal Loi should be on getting rid of old belongings and cleansing the mind in readiness of the festival of Tirmoor which is observed the day after Lal Loi by all Sindhis. Tirmoor is the Sindhi name for Makar Sankranti. For Sindhis, Makar Sankranti means worshipping Lord Sun and flying kites.

According to some, not all Sindhis observe Lal Loi  and the festival may have been observed by people of Upper Sindh where historically there has been inward migration from Punjab. It is however difficult to establish where Lal Loi was celebrated in Sindh or if it is observed there now. However, the Sindhis community in India celebrate Lal Loi annually where festivals are organised in places such as Indore where the festival is organised by the Sindhu Sabha,  Mumbai and Udaipur.

In places where Sindhis and Punjabis live in the same city, joint Lal Loi/Lohri festivals are organised.

See also
 Makar Sankranti
 Pongal
 Ahir
 Bhogali Bihu
 Sankranti
 Winter Solstice
 Lohri

References

Sindhi culture
Festivals in Sindh